Dr.Yasmin Modassir (1953 – October 5, 2016) was an Indian academician, scientist and Principal at Dhempe College of Arts and Science,
 a college affiliated to the Goa University, Miramar, Goa.

Biography 
Born in Uttar Pradesh, she received her doctorate degree in 1980 from Aligarh Muslim University. She was involved in scientific research in Zoology and fisheries from 1975 in a career spanning 39 years. She was the recipient of Senior Research Fellowship and Post-Doctoral Fellowship of Council of Scientific and Industrial Research (CSIR) New Delhi. She joined Dhempe College of Arts and Science as a faculty member in 1981, becoming Head of the Department of Zoology in 1996. She became Chair of Vice-Principal in 2003, Principal in 2006 and retired in September 2016.

Areas of research 
Modassir's research included Limnology, culture of molluscs; conservation strategies for mangrove ecosystems; zooplankton of saltpans; effects of pollutants on marine fauna. https://issuu.com/herald-goa/docs/sep5/12

Professional affiliations 
She was a founder member of All Goa Association of Zoologists, and a life member of the Mangrove Society of India, the Society of Bio-sciences, the Academy of Sciences for Animal Welfare and the National Environmental Science Academy (Goa chapter).

Honours 
 "Environmentalist of the Year" Award 2002 for outstanding contribution in the field of Environmental Biology by the International Board of Awards of National Environmental Science Academy, India.   
 Conferred fellowship of the Academy of Sciences, Engineering and Technology (F.ASET) for outstanding contribution for furthering Knowledge systems in service of the society to improve the quality of life of people -July, 2007.
 Conferred fellowship by Society of Biosciences for outstanding contribution in biological science in 1995.

Publications

Research papers 

 Modassir, Y. (1977). Ecological observations on the SEPSID fauna of cattle dung. Journal of Zoological  Research, 1: 31-32
 Modassir, Y. (1977). Field Studies on the mating behavior of Certain Sepsidae. Journal of Zoological  Research, 1 (2): 47-48
 Modassir, Y. (1990). Ecology and production of a benthic bivalve Meretrix casta (Chemnitz) in the Mandovi estuary, Goa. Indian Journal of Marine Sciences, 19: 125-127 (ISSN No:0379-5136)
 Modassir, Y. (1991). Growth and seasonal changes in biochemical composition in black clam Villorita cyprinoide (Gray). Mahasagar, 24 (2), 119-125
 Chatterji, A. Modassir, Y. and Kanti, A. (1992). Studies on the food and feeding habit of Labeo bata (Ham). Geobios, 19: 61-67
 Modassir, Y. (1993). Color preference and sensitivity to pesticides in Sepsis nitens" Geobios, 20 (2): 81-84
 Modassir, Y. (1993). Effect of environmental factors on the seasonal abundance of Sepsid flies. Geobios, 20 (4): 241-246
 Modassir, Y. (1995). Effect of temperature on hatching & larval duration in Sepsis nitens. Journal Bombay Natural History Society, 92(2): 280–282.
 Modassir, Y. (1996). Seafood & Our Health. Encology, 10 (8): January, 25-29
 Modassir, Y. and Ansari Azra (2000). Effect of petroleum hydrocarbon on physiological & biochemical parameters in an estuarine bivalve, Paphia malabarica. Fishery Technology, 37 (1): 40-45
 Modassir, Y. (2000). The inter-tidal fauna inhabiting an exposed sandy beach at Miramar, Goa. Advances in Biosciences, 19 (1): 19-32
 Modassir, Y. (2000). Effect of salinity on the toxicity on the mercury in Mangrove clam, Polymesoda erosa. (Lightfoot 1786), Asian Fisheries Science, 13: 335-341
 Modassir, Y. (2004). Prospects of the green mussel Perna viridis (Linnaeus) culture by raft method in the state of Goa for rural development. Bulletin of the  Environmental  Science,  XXII (2):138-146
 Modassir, Y. (2008). Effect of temperature and salinity on growth of a hyper saline ciliate, Fabrea salina. Journal of Ecophysiology and Occupational Health, 8: 207-210
 Modassir, Y. (2009). Studies on laboratory culture of a ciliate, Fabrea salina using inert feed Journal of Ecophysiology and Occupational Health, 9: 1-4
 Modassir, Y. and Azara Ansari (2010). Distribution and ecology of molluscs in the estuarine mangroves of Goa. Proceedings of the National Academy of Sciences, India, Section B-Biological Sciences, 80(IV):323-331
 Modassir, Y. and Ansari Azra (2011). Health and Hygiene: Status of the fisherwomen in the state of Goa. Biological Forum- An International Journal, 3 (1):.57-60
 Modassir, Y. and Ansari Azra (2011). Plankton community of the hypersaline Salterns of Goa, India. Biological Forum- An International Journal, 3 (1): 78-81
 Modassir, Y. (2011). Fish species diversity and its potential for angling fishing in Goa- An overview. Indian Journal of Applied and Pure Biology, 26 (2) 291-304
 Modassir Y. and Chatterji, A (2011). Oxygen consumption in juveniles of tiger shrimp, (Penaeus monodon Fabricius)   under different environmental conditions. Indian Journal of Applied and Pure Biology, 26(2):327-338.
 Modassir, Y. and Chatterji, A. (2011). Growth of tiger prawn, Penaeus monodon in a re-circulating seawater system. Journal of Coastal Environment, 2 (2)
 Modassir, Y. et al., (2013), Geochemical Assessment of Groundwater Quality in Mhadei River Watershed, Goa-India.  International Journal of Theoretical and Applied Science (Accepted)

Contribution to books 
 "Conservation and sustainable management of molluscan resources along    Goa coast, central west coast of India".
 Chapter published in the book "Recent advances in Environmental Sciences". Published by Discovery publishing house, in 2002.
 "Tenacious molluscs", in the book "Know your shore: Goa", World Wide Fund-India. Sponsored by the Department of Science, Technology and Environment, Goa. December 2004, pp 96–104.

References

Indian women biologists
2016 deaths
20th-century Indian women scientists
Women scientists from Goa
Women scientists from Uttar Pradesh
Scientists from Lucknow
Aligarh Muslim University alumni
1953 births
Women zoologists
20th-century Indian biologists
21st-century Indian biologists
21st-century Indian women scientists